The 1914 Australian federal election was held in Australia on 5 September 1914. The election had been called before the declaration of war in August 1914. All 75 seats in the House of Representatives and all 36 seats in the Senate were up for election, as a result of the first double dissolution being granted. The incumbent Liberal Party, led by Prime Minister Joseph Cook, was defeated by the opposition Labor Party under Andrew Fisher, who returned for a third term as Prime Minister.

The Cook Government is one of only two non-Labor Governments in Australian history that did not last longer than the Labor Government it had replaced; the other was the Howard Government, which was defeated in 2007.

Fisher is one of only two Opposition Leaders from the Labor party to become Prime Minister with previous federal ministerial experience, the other being Anthony Albanese . This election was the second time he accomplished this, the first being in 1910.  

This election resulted in the highest ever primary vote percentage for the Labor party at 50.89% and was the first time that the Labor party achieved more than 50% of the primary vote. The only other time this happened was in 1954.

Results

House of Representatives

Notes
 Independents: George Wise (Gippsland, Vic)
 Thirteen members were elected unopposed – seven Labor and six Liberal.

Senate

Seats changing hands

Post-election pendulum

See also
 Candidates of the 1914 Australian federal election
 Members of the Australian House of Representatives, 1914–1917
 Members of the Australian Senate, 1914–1917

Notes

References
University of WA election results in Australia since 1890

Federal elections in Australia
1914 elections in Australia
September 1914 events